Melanie Nivison Oppenheimer,  (born 9 November 1957) is an Australian historian, who specialises in the history of volunteering, and a former actress.

Early life and acting
Oppenheimer was born in Sydney, New South Wales, and studied for a Bachelor of Arts degree at the University of New England (UNE). When UNE opened a drama department, she "fell in love with acting" and went on to enrol at the Webber Douglas Academy of Dramatic Art in London before starting a career as an actress on Australian television. She played Sarah Carson, the daughter of lead character Jennifer Carson (played by Lorraine Bayly), on the television series Carson's Law from 1984 to 1986.

Academic career
Oppenheimer returned to UNE to complete a Master of Letters, and then a Doctor of Philosophy at Macquarie University. She worked as a research assistant in the history department of the University of Sydney, then held associate professor positions at the University of Western Sydney and the University of New England.

The Australian Red Cross commissioned Oppenheimer to write an official history of the organisation in 2010, its centennial year. The book, The Power of Humanity: 100 Years of Australian Red Cross, was published by HarperCollins and launched by the Governor-General of Australia, Sir Peter Cosgrove, in August 2014. She has written several biographical articles for the Australian Dictionary of Biography.

On 1 July 2013, Oppenheimer took up a professorship as Chair of History at Flinders University in South Australia. She was elected a Fellow of the Academy of the Social Sciences in Australia (FASSA) in 2017.

Selected works

References

External links

1957 births
Alumni of the Webber Douglas Academy of Dramatic Art
Australian television actresses
Australian women historians
Fellows of the Academy of the Social Sciences in Australia
Academic staff of Flinders University
Living people
Macquarie University alumni
University of New England (Australia) alumni
Academic staff of the University of New England (Australia)
Academic staff of Western Sydney University
20th-century Australian historians
20th-century Australian women